The 1895 Hyde Park Athletic Association football team represented the Hyde Park Athletic Association of Hyde Park, Boston, during the 1895 college football season.  The Athletics compiled a 0–3–2 record, a low point for the team after winning the suburban league championship the last two years, and were outscored 78 to 8.  They would lose their silver cup to Newton Athletic Association in a three-game championship series.

During the season, Hyde Park AA and Newton AA played a three-game series for the honor of a silver cup that was bestowed upon the champion of the "suburban league", which had apparently disbanded the year prior, and needed to resolve the question of who would keep the silver trophy indefinitely.  The cup would be given to whichever team managed to win two or more of the contests, which would turn out to be the NAA, compiling a 2–0–1 record against Hyde Park.

Schedule

References

Hyde Park Athletic Association
Hyde Park Athletic Association football seasons
Hyde Park Athletic Association football